This page provides supplementary chemical data on silicon tetrachloride.

Material Safety Data Sheet  

The handling of this chemical may incur notable safety precautions. It is highly recommend that you seek the Material Safety Datasheet (MSDS) for this chemical from a reliable source, it this case, noting that one should "avoid all contact! In all cases consult a doctor! ...  inhalation causes sore throat and Burning sensation".

Structure and properties

Thermodynamic properties

Spectral data

References

NIST Standard Reference Database
David R. Lide, ed. Handbook of Chemistry and Physics, 85th Edition, Internet Version 2005. CRC Press, 2005.
Chemical data pages
Chemical data pages cleanup